Șușița may refer to several places in Romania:

 Șușița, a village in Breznița-Ocol Commune, Mehedinți County
 Șușița, a village in Grozești Commune, Mehedinți County
 Șușița (Mehedinți), a tributary of the Jiu in Mehedinți and Gorj Counties
 Șușița (Gorj), a tributary of the Jiu in Gorj County
 Șușița (Siret), a tributary of the Siret in Vrancea County